J. Vaidhyanathan affectionately known as JV is a Mridangam exponent from Tamil Nadu, India. He was the first mridangist to receive the Yuva Kala Bharathi Award, Vellore Gopalachariar Memorial award and Isai Peroli Award. He also received several other awards including Kalaimamani the highest civilian award for artists in Tamil Nadu and Sangeet Natak Akademi Award, the highest Indian recognition given to practicing artists.

Biography
J. Vaidhyanathan was born on 22 April 1965 to Carnatic musician D. K. Jayaraman and J. Jayalakshmi in Damal near Kanchipuram in Tamil Nadu. He was the youngest of his parents' three children. The family moved to Chennai a few years after he was born. 

He is the nephew of D. K. Pattammal. Hails from a family of legendary Carnatic musicians, he started  learning music at a very young age. Vaidhyanathan studied mridangam under  T. K. Murthy. His sister C. Sukanya is a Carnatic vocalist.

He had performed mridangam with many famous Carnatic musicians like D.K. Jayaraman, D. K. Pattammal, M. S. Subbulakshmi, M. L. Vasanthakumari, K. V. Narayanaswamy, Semmangudi Srinivasa Iyer, M. Balamuralikrishna, T. N. Krishnan, M. S. Gopalakrishnan,  S. Balachander and Lalgudi Jayaraman. He was awarded a Junior Scholarship by the Government of India in 1985.

Personal life
His wife Poorna, who holds a doctorate in music on Pattammal's music, has been a violin lecturer at the S. V. College of Music and Dance in Tirupati, run by Tirumala Tirupati Devasthanams, since 2005.

Awards and honors
 Sangeet Natak Akademi Award 2016
 Kalaimamani 2006
 Yuva Kala Bharathi Award
 Vellore Gopalachariar Memorial award from Sruti Magazine
 Isai Peroli from Kartik Fine Arts
 Award from Chennai Music Academy 2019

References 

1965 births
Living people
Mridangam players
Carnatic instrumentalists
Indian male classical musicians
Recipients of the Sangeet Natak Akademi Award
Indian Tamil people
People from Kanchipuram district